The 2020 Zed Tennis Open was a professional tennis tournament played on outdoor hard courts. It was the first edition of the tournament which was part of the 2020 ITF Women's World Tennis Tour. It took place in Cairo, Egypt between 10 and 16 February 2020.

Singles main-draw entrants

Seeds

 1 Rankings are as of 3 February 2020.

Other entrants
The following players received wildcards into the singles main draw:
  Lamis Alhussein Abdel Aziz
  Linda Fruhvirtová
  Sandra Samir
  Lesia Tsurenko

The following players received entry from the qualifying draw:
  Cristiana Ferrando
  Anastasia Gasanova
  Ane Mintegi del Olmo
  Katarzyna Piter
  Dejana Radanović
  Alice Ramé
  Shalimar Talbi
  Anna Zaja

Champions

Singles

 Irina-Camelia Begu def.  Lesia Tsurenko, 6–4, 3–6, 6–2

Doubles

 Aleksandra Krunić /  Katarzyna Piter def.  Arantxa Rus /  Mayar Sherif, 6–4, 6–2

References

External links
 2020 Zed Tennis Open at ITFtennis.com

2020 ITF Women's World Tennis Tour
2020 in Egyptian sport
February 2020 sports events in Egypt
Tennis tournaments in Egypt